The 2015–2017 ICC World Cricket League Championship was the second edition of the ICC World Cricket League Championship. It took place from 2015 until 2017, in parallel with the 2015-17 ICC Intercontinental Cup. Both Ireland and Afghanistan had been promoted to the main ICC ODI Championship and did not compete in this tournament.  Instead, Kenya and Nepal were included in the tournament. The tournament was played in a round-robin format. All matches were recorded as List A matches, and those in which both teams had ODI status were also recorded as ODIs.

The Netherlands won the tournament and joined the thirteen-team 2020–23 ICC Cricket World Cup Super League. The Netherlands regained their ODI status after losing it at the 2014 Cricket World Cup Qualifier. Inclusion in the ICC ODI League will mean they will play 24 fixtures against Full Members until 2022.

The Netherlands, along with Scotland, Papua New Guinea and Hong Kong also joined the lowest ranked four teams from the ICC ODI Championship (as of September 2017) in the 2018 Cricket World Cup Qualifier. The bottom four teams, Kenya, Nepal, the United Arab Emirates and Namibia were all relegated to Division Two and played the finalists of Division Three for the remaining two spots in the 2018 CWC Qualifier.

Teams
The following eight teams took part in the tournament based on the results from 2014 Cricket World Cup Qualifier and the 2015 ICC World Cricket League Division Two:
  (1st in 2014 Cricket World Cup Qualifier, New Zealand)
  (2nd in 2014 Cricket World Cup Qualifier, New Zealand)
  (3rd in 2014 Cricket World Cup Qualifier, New Zealand)
  (4th in 2014 Cricket World Cup Qualifier, New Zealand)
  (1st in 2015 ICC World Cricket League Division Two, Namibia)
  (2nd in 2015 ICC World Cricket League Division Two, Namibia)
  (3rd in 2015 ICC World Cricket League Division Two, Namibia)
  (4th in 2015 ICC World Cricket League Division Two, Namibia)

Fixtures
The breakdown of fixtures was as follows: During each round, each team played against their opponent twice.

Points table

Matches

Round 1
The fixtures for round one were announced on 5 May 2015.

Round 2
The fixtures for round two were announced in August 2015.

Round 3
The fixtures for round three were announced in December 2015.

Round 4
The fixtures for round four were announced in April 2016. The venue for the fixtures in Kenya was confirmed in November 2016.

Round 5
The fixtures between Hong Kong and the Netherlands were announced by the Koninklijke Nederlandse Cricket Bond in December 2016. Cricket Scotland confirmed the venue for their fixtures in February 2017.

Round 6
The matches between Kenya and the Netherlands were originally scheduled to be held at the Gymkhana Club Ground in Nairobi. However, they were moved to Buffalo Park, East London, South Africa, due to security concerns ahead of the re-running of the Kenyan presidential election.

Round 7
The fixtures for Round 7 were announced after the conclusion of the final game in Round 6. The ICC confirmed all the squads and match officials for the fixtures on 5 December 2017.

Statistics

Most runs

Most wickets

References

External links
 Series home at ESPN Cricinfo

Championship, 2015
International cricket competitions in 2015
International cricket competitions in 2015–16
International cricket competitions in 2016
International cricket competitions in 2016–17
International cricket competitions in 2017